A Death in the Small Hours, by Charles Finch, is a novel set in England during the Victorian era.  It is the sixth novel in the Charles Lenox series.

Plot summary
Charles Lenox, gentleman and former amateur detective, is now a prominent Member of the House of Commons.  When selected to make the opening speech at the next session of Parliament, he takes up an offer to spend some time at his uncle’s estate in Somerset. Although Lenox expected to find a few quiet weeks to prepare his speech, instead he finds a bizarre case of vandalism in the quiet village, and the murder of a local constable. Lenox investigates and finds that the situation is far more complex and sinister than it first appeared.

Publication history
A Death in the Small Hours was first published in hardcover by St. Martin’s Minotaur and released November 2012.  The trade paperback was released in August 2013.

Reception
Finch received favorable reviews in several major newspapers. Publishers Weekly called it “superb”

References

External links
  A Death in the Small Hours Official Macmillan Page
  Review by Kirkus Reviews

2012 American novels
Historical mystery novels
Novels set in Somerset
Fiction set in 1874
Novels set in the 1870s
Novels set in Victorian England
Novels by Charles Finch
Charles Lenox novels
Minotaur Books books